In vector calculus, a vector potential is a vector field whose curl is a given vector field. This is analogous to a scalar potential, which is a scalar field whose gradient is a given vector field.

Formally, given a vector field v, a vector potential is a  vector field A such that

Consequence
If a vector field v admits a vector potential A, then from the equality 

(divergence of the curl is zero) one obtains

which implies that v must be a solenoidal vector field.

Theorem
Let 

be a solenoidal vector field which is twice continuously differentiable.
Define

Here,  is curl for variable y.
Substituting curl[v] for the current density j of the retarded potential, you will get this formula. In other words, v corresponds to the H-field.

You can restrict the integral domain to any single-connected region Ω. That is, A' below is also a vector potential of v;

A generalization of this theorem is the Helmholtz decomposition which states that any vector field can be decomposed as a sum of a solenoidal vector field and an irrotational vector field.

By analogy with Biot-Savart's law, the following  is also qualify as a vector potential for v.

Substitute j (current density) for v and H (H-field)for A, we will find the  Biot-Savart law.

Let  and let the Ω be a star domain  centered on the p  then,
translating Poincaré's lemma for differential forms into vector fields world, the followng  is also a vector potential for the

Nonuniqueness
The vector potential admitted by a solenoidal field is not unique.

where  is any continuously differentiable scalar function. This follows from the fact that the curl of the gradient is zero.

This nonuniqueness leads to a degree of freedom in the formulation of electrodynamics, or gauge freedom, and requires choosing a gauge.

See also 
 Fundamental theorem of vector calculus
 Magnetic vector potential
 Solenoid
 Closed and Exact Differential Forms

References 
 Fundamentals of Engineering Electromagnetics by David K. Cheng, Addison-Wesley, 1993.

Concepts in physics
Potentials
Vector calculus
Vector physical quantities